Horace Wass (26 August 1903 – 14 January 1969) was an English sportsman, who made over 400 Football League appearances playing football for Chesterfield  from 1920 to 1937  and for Southport  in 1937. He also played first-class cricket for Derbyshire in 1929.

Football
Wass was born in Chesterfield, Derbyshire. He started playing football with Chesterfield in 1920 as an amateur, turning professional two years later. He remained with the club until the end of the 1936–37 season. He then moved to Southport, for whom he played 20 league games. He had a trial at Gainsborough Trinity in 1938 and played for Chelmsford City in the Southern Football League.

Cricket
Wass played one first-class match for Derbyshire against Glamorgan during the 1929 season, in which he played one innings to make 9 runs. Though he did not appear again for Derbyshire, he became a leading light in the days of pre-war Scottish cricket, making his first appearances during 1935, and further appearances against teams assembled by Sir Julien Cahn between 1935 and 1937. He appeared for Scotland eight times in total: twice against the South Africans, once against the Australians and five times against Sir Julien Cahn's XI. These games did not have first-class status. He was a right-handed batsman.

Wass went to Australia, where he was an active football and cricket coach with the Hills District junior teams. He was also an outstanding senior golfer based at the Monash Country Club in Sydney.

Horace Wass died of heart failure at his home in Baulkham Hills, New South Wales, at the age of 65.

References

External links
Horace Wass at Cricket Archive
Horace Wass at Cricinfo.com

1903 births
1969 deaths
English cricketers
Derbyshire cricketers
Cricketers from Chesterfield, Derbyshire
English footballers
Association football wing halves
Chesterfield F.C. players
Southport F.C. players
Chelmsford City F.C. players
Footballers from Chesterfield
English emigrants to Australia